They Were So Young is a 1954 German-American drama film directed by Kurt Neumann and written by Felix Lützkendorf, Kurt Neumann and the blacklisted screenwriters Dalton Trumbo and Michael Wilson (both uncredited). The film stars Scott Brady, Raymond Burr and Johanna Matz and was released on January 7, 1955 by Lippert Pictures. It was shot at the  Bendestorf Studios near Hamburg. The film's sets were designed by the art director Hans Sohnle.

Plot

Cast 
 Scott Brady as Richard Lanning
Raymond Burr as Jaime Coltos         
Johanna Matz as Eve Ullmann
Uncredited (in order of appearance)
Ingrid Stenn as Connie Brewers
Gisela Fackeldey as Mme. Lansowa
Kurt Meisel as Pasquale
Katharina Mayberg as Felicia
Eduard Linkers as M. Albert
Gordon Howard as Garza
Elizabeth Tanney as Emily
Erica Beer as Elise LeFevre
Hanita Hallan as Lena
Hannelore Axman as Vincenta 
Willy Trenk-Trebitsch as Bulanos   
Pero Alexander as Manuel
Josef Dahmen as Dr. Perez  
Gert Fröbe as Lobos
Caterina Valente as Singer

References

External links 
 

1954 films
1954 crime drama films
American crime drama films
West German films
English-language German films
Films directed by Kurt Neumann
Films with screenplays by Dalton Trumbo
Films with screenplays by Michael Wilson (writer)
Films set in Brazil
Films about prostitution in Brazil
Lippert Pictures films
German black-and-white films
American black-and-white films
1950s English-language films
1950s American films